Kurt Frederick (born 27 April 1991) is an international soccer player from Saint Lucia, who plays as a left back for the Saint Lucia national team and for W Connection in the TT Pro League.

Career statistics

International

International goals
Score and results lists Saint Lucia's goals first.

References

External links
 
 caribbeanfootballdatabase.com
 
 
 
 au.eurosport.com
 sports.opera.com
 Caribbean Football Database Profile

Living people
1991 births
Saint Lucian footballers
Saint Lucia international footballers
TT Pro League players
Expatriate footballers in Trinidad and Tobago
Saint Lucian expatriate sportspeople in Trinidad and Tobago
Expatriate footballers in Costa Rica
Saint Lucian expatriate sportspeople in Costa Rica
Saint Lucian expatriate footballers
Association football fullbacks
W Connection F.C. players
L.D. Alajuelense footballers
Saint Lucia youth international footballers